Juratinden or Gjuratinden is a mountain on the border of the municipalities of Molde and Rauma in Møre og Romsdal county, Norway.

The summit climb is close to scrambling, but a rope is recommended for the final .

See also
List of mountains of Norway

References

Mountains of Møre og Romsdal
Molde
Rauma, Norway